Hull City Council Training (HCC Training, informally known as Hull Training) is a further education and higher education training provider in Hull, England. It is a separately run department of Hull City Council.

Hull Training offers apprenticeships and professional development courses, and is registered with 12 awarding bodies. It consists of seven separate centres based around Hull, where each centre specialises in a different industry.
Endeavour Learning and Skills Centre
Orchard Park Campus - Engineering, CNC
Craven Park Training and Enterprise Centre - IT, Business Administration, Customer Service
Youth Enterprise - Business Studies

Following a 2010 inspection, an Ofsted report declared Hull Training as Grade 2.

Notable alumni
Karl Turner (British politician), Member of Parliament.

References

External links 
Hull City Council

Education in Kingston upon Hull